Francis Lawrence (born March 26, 1971) is an Austrian-born American filmmaker and producer. After establishing himself as a director of music videos and commercials, Lawrence made his feature-length directorial debut with the superhero thriller Constantine (2005) and has since directed the post-apocalyptic horror film I Am Legend (2007), the romantic drama Water for Elephants (2011), three of the four films in the  Hunger Games film series, and the spy thriller Red Sparrow (2018).

Early life

Lawrence was born to American parents in Vienna, Austria. His father was a theoretical physicist who taught at California State University, Northridge, and his mother is a vice president of technology at a public-relations agency based in his hometown.

He moved to Los Angeles at the age of four. Lawrence worked as second assistant camera on the feature Pump Up the Volume directed by Allan Moyle prior to earning his bachelor's degree in film production at Loyola Marymount University Film School.

Career
He went on to work as first assistant director on the feature Marching out of Time directed by Anton Vassil in 1993. Lawrence then joined ex-classmate Michael Jason Rosen in co-directing music videos. Lawrence directed his first music videos for the San Jose band A Western Front.  Rosen and Lawrence made the two videos for a total of $3,000 with  Jeffrey Michael Cutter, another ex-classmate, shooting for them.  Lawrence, Rosen, and Cutter also made a video for  Michael Blakey, president of Atico Records and Tidal Force drummer, for that band's single, "A Man Rides Through". Soon, Lawrence became known for his original and imaginative music video scripts and visual directing style.

He eventually joined a major new production company and his successful career as music video director, having worked with stars Rihanna, Green Day, Britney Spears, Black Eyed Peas, Jay-Z, Melanie C, Avril Lavigne, Aerosmith, Janet Jackson, Jennifer Lopez, Lady Gaga, Fastball, Lisa Marie Presley, Destiny's Child, Garbage, Gwen Stefani, Pink, Shakira, Nelly Furtado, En Vogue, Monica, Missy Elliott, and the Backstreet Boys. In 2002, he won a Latin Grammy Award for Best Short Music Video for directing Shakira's "Suerte" music video. He has also directed numerous commercials for clients such as Coca-Cola, L'Oréal, Calvin Klein, Pepsi-Cola, Maybelline, Kid's Footlocker, Bacardi, McDonald's, GAP, Bud Light, CoverGirl, Oldsmobile, and Disneyland. In 2005, his feature-film debut was Constantine, based on the Hellblazer comic book, starring Keanu Reeves.

In 2007, he directed I Am Legend (based on the Richard Matheson novel), with Will Smith. In 2011, he directed Water for Elephants. In 2012, Lawrence directed and executive produced the pilot episode of the Fox paranormal series Touch. He is currently signed to DNA Inc. In 2011, he won a Grammy Award for Best Music Video, Short Form for directing Lady Gaga's "Bad Romance" music video.

In April 2012, Lionsgate announced that Lawrence had been selected to direct the film adaptation of the novel Catching Fire. The book and film were the sequel to the blockbuster hit The Hunger Games, starring Jennifer Lawrence (no relation). This film adaptation of The Hunger Games was directed by Gary Ross, and both novels were written by Suzanne Collins. Lawrence was officially confirmed as the director for the film on May 3, 2012.

He returned to direct the two final parts of the series, The Hunger Games: Mockingjay – Part 1 (2014) and Part 2 (2015). Lawrence is currently working on a film adaptation of the novel Survivor by Chuck Palahniuk.

He most recently directed Red Sparrow, based on the novel of the same name by Jason Matthews, and featuring The Hunger Games star Jennifer Lawrence and Joel Edgerton. The film was released on March 2, 2018.

Lawrence signed on to direct The Ballad of Songbirds and Snakes,  an adaptation of the Hunger Games prequel novel by original author Suzanne Collins, in April 2020. The film is set to begin production in 2022 for release on November 17, 2023.

In March 2021, his about:blank production company struck a deal with New Republic Pictures. Their first project together will be an adaptation of the Philip K. Dick novel Vulcan's Hammer, announced in November 2021. In March 2022, it was announced that Lawrence would be directing a feature adaptation of Kevin J. Anderson and Steven L. Sears’ Stalag-X, to be written by Joy Wilkinson. In April 2022, it was announced that Lawrence will be one of the executive producers of Chief Of War for Apple TV+.

In August 2022, TheWrap reported that Lawrence had signed with Netflix to direct an adaptation of Bioshock, inspired by the 2K Games franchise. In September of the same year, Deadline reported that the director would also be returning to direct a sequel to Constantine.

Filmography

References

External links 

 
 Francis Lawrence  at the mvdbase.com
 Biografie of Francis Lawrence at The New York Times

1971 births
Living people
Action film directors
American expatriates in Austria
American music video directors
Austrian people of American descent
Film directors from Los Angeles
Film producers from California
Grammy Award winners
Latin Grammy Award winners
Musicians from Vienna
Television commercial directors